Kher is a Hindu Brahmin surname primarily found within Kashmiri Pandits from the Kashmir valley and Karhade Brahmins in Maharashtra.

Notable people with Kher surname are:

Anupam Kher (born 1955), Indian actor 
B. G. Kher (1888–1957), Indian politician
Govind Ballal Kher (1710), Indian Military of Peshwas in Bundelkhand
Bharti Kher (born 1969), Indian contemporary artist
Kailash Kher, Indian pop-rock and Bollywood playback singer 
Kirron Kher (born 1955), Indian theatre, film and television actress, wife of Anupam
Raju Kher, Indian actor and director
Saiyami Kher, Indian actress
Sikandar Kher, Indian actor, son of Kirron Kher and step-son of Anupam Kher
Uttara Mhatre Kher (born 1963), Indian model and beauty pageant contestant